Valorie Mae Curry (born February 12, 1986) is an American actress. Her credits include Veronica Mars (2005–06), The Following (2013–14) and The Tick (2016–19).<ref name=OrangeCountyRegister>Gaede, Susan (December 1, 2010). "AEDE: Sonora grad cast in 'Twilight' movie". Orange County Register. Retrieved on 2013-06-29.</ref> She also starred as the titular character in the PlayStation 3 tech demo Kara (2012) and reprised the role in the video game Detroit: Become Human (2018). In 2023, she joined the cast of the Amazon Prime Video series The Boys as the superhero Firecracker.

Early life
Curry grew up with her brother David and sister Colleen in Orange County, California, graduating from Sonora High School in La Habra, California in 2004. She attended California State University, Fullerton, receiving a degree in theater. She has also worked with The Second City and Phantom Projects theatre groups, performing such roles as Jennie Mae in The Diviners and Monique in Out, Out, Brief Candle!, as well as roles in Oklahoma!, Bus Stop, How to Succeed in Business Without Really Trying, and The Diary of Anne Frank.

 Personal life 
Curry married actor Sam Underwood, her The Following'' co-star, in July 2016.

She came out as pansexual on National Coming Out Day 2019.

Filmography

Film

Television

Music videos

Video games

Awards and nominations

References

External links 

1986 births
Living people
Place of birth missing (living people)
Actresses from Orange County, California
California State University, Fullerton alumni
American film actresses
American television actresses
American video game actresses
21st-century American actresses
Pansexual actresses
American LGBT actors
LGBT people from California